Lahore Cantonment railway station (Urdu and ) is located in Lahore Cantonment, Lahore district of Punjab province of the Pakistan.

See also
 List of railway stations in Pakistan
 Pakistan Railways

References

External links

Lahore Cantonment
Railway stations in Lahore District
Railway stations on Karachi–Peshawar Line (ML 1)
Transport in Lahore